Emmanuel Taylor Gordon (April 29, 1893 – May 5, 1971) was a singer and vaudeville performer associated with the Harlem Renaissance in the mid-1920s.  He was born in White Sulphur Springs, Montana and moved to New York City at the age of 17.  His career faded after the 1920s, and in 1959 he retired to White Sulphur Springs, where he died in 1971. In addition to his singing career, Gordon is remembered today for his 1929 autobiography, Born to Be, which recounts his youth as an Afro-American in small-town Montana, and his experiences in 1920s Harlem.

References

External links
 Black Past
 Montana Historical Society

1893 births
1971 deaths
Writers from Montana
Singers from Montana
Singers from New York (state)
Vaudeville performers
People from White Sulphur Springs, Montana
20th-century American singers
20th-century American male singers